The Beechcraft Queen Air is a twin-engined light aircraft produced by Beechcraft in several versions from 1960 to 1978. Based upon the Twin Bonanza, with which it shared key components such as wings, engines, and tail surfaces, but featuring a larger fuselage, it served as the basis for the highly successful King Air series of turboprop aircraft. It is often used as a private aircraft, a utility, or a small commuter airliner. Production ran for 17 years.

Design and development
The company's Twin Bonanza was reaching the limits of development so Beechcraft decided to develop a design with a larger fuselage and new tail which it designated the Beech 65. Early in development the United States Army which had been a customer of the Twin Bonanza (which it called the L-23 Seminole), ordered 68 aircraft under the designation L-23F. The prototype Beech 65 first flew on August 28, 1958.

The Queen Air is a twin-engined nine-seat low-wing cantilever cabin monoplane with a retractable landing gear with a nose wheel. It was initially powered by two  Lycoming IGSO-480 six-cylinder, horizontally opposed piston engine.

The Model 65 received a Federal Aviation Authority type certificate on February 4, 1959 and the first deliveries were made soon after. On February 8, 1960 a Queen Air achieved a new height record of 34,862 feet.

The basic Model 65 was in production until 1967 when the improved Model A65 with a swept rather than vertical tail was introduced. Production continued with further variants introducing pressurisation and turboprop engines.

Variants

65
This is the initial version of the Queen Air, powered by two Lycoming IGSO-480s producing . Fitted with short span wings and a straight unswept tail. Usually referred to as a "straight 65". 316 built from 1959 to 1967.

A65
First produced in 1967 the A65 is very similar to the straight 65. The major change was the addition of a swept tail with a dorsal fin. Available fuel was also increased, with a maximum capacity of  when auxiliary tanks are fitted. A total of 96 A65s were built between 1967 and 1970.

70
Introduced in 1968. This aircraft is similar to the A65 in that it is powered by the  Lycoming IGSO-480, however it has the longer wing of the 80 series. This allows the 70 to have a greater lifting ability than the 65 but a lower fuel burn and operating cost than the 80. It is, essentially, an A65 with the B80 wing. A total of 35 were built between 1969 and 1971.

80
First flying on June 22, 1961 and certified on February 20, 1962, the Queen Air 80 (also known as the Model 65-80) was the first of the Queen Airs to have the swept tail, although it retained the short-span wings of the Model 65. It was powered by a more powerful Lycoming IGSO-540 which produced .

A80

Other major changes to the A80 included a redesign of the aircraft nose, an increase in fuel capacity and a 500-pound increase in takeoff weight to  gross weight. 121 built between 1964 and 1966.

B80
Introduced in 1966 the B80 was to be the final production model. The B80 was by far the longest produced Queen Air with production lasting some 12 years. Available with 380 hp Lycoming IGSO-540-A1A or  Lycoming IGSO-540-A1D engines. A total of 242 aircraft were built from 1966 to 1977.

88

Introduced in 1965 the model 88 is a pressurized version of the Queen Air. This aircraft featured round cabin windows that make the 88 look quite similar to a 90 series King Air. It also shares the engines and long wing of the B80. Sales were slack due to its higher sales price and lower useful load as compared to the B80. Only 47 examples were ever produced of which two were converted to King Air standard and the model 88 aircraft was removed from production in 1969. The first two models of the King Air's official designation were BE65-90 and BE65-A90 owing to its Queen Air heritage.

Excalibur

This is a modification performed in the aftermarket by supplemental type certificates (STCs) to the BE65. It resolves the biggest issue of the Queen Air design, the engines. This is accomplished by replacing the rather cantankerous (if operated incorrectly) six-cylinder Lycoming IGSO-480s and Lycoming IGSO-540s, with the far more robust eight-cylinder Lycoming IO-720. This presents the major advantage of not having a gearbox or superchargers to cause maintenance and reliability problems. However the loss of the supercharger does limit the cruising altitude to below fifteen thousand feet. The US Army National Guard installed this modification on some of their aircraft. The Excalibur Queen Air can be recognized by the noticeably smaller engine cowlings and lower-set engines. This STC was originally designed and produced by Ed Swearingen who was well known for his work on the Twin Bonanza, Queen Air, and later Swearingen aircraft (Merlin and Metro). The ownership of this STC has changed hands many times over the years. The current owner is Bemidji Aviation which operates a fleet of Excalibur Queen Airs as well as other aircraft in the charter and freight role in the upper mid-west of the United States.

Production number details
This list provides a detailed account of production by Beechcraft of individual variants. Production numbers per year from the Hawker Beechcraft serialization list.
65 and A65 - 339 built
70 - 37 built
80, A80, B80 - 509 built
88 - 45 built
Total - 930 built

Military operators

 
 Algerian Air Force - 3 B80s in service as of 1986.
 
 Argentine Army Aviation
 Argentine Naval Aviation - 5 B80s as of 1986.
 Argentine National Gendarmerie - At least one aircraft confiscated from drug smugglers operated in late 1990s
  Eight aircraft received,
  One Queen Air operated.
 
 Colombian Air Force
 
 Air Force of the Dominican Republic
 
 Ecuadorian Army
 
 Border Security Force
 
 Israeli Air Force - Seven B80s received.
 
Haiti Air Corps
 
 Japan Air Self-Defense Force
Central Air Command Support Squadron
 Japan Maritime Self Defense Force
  - One Model 80
 
 
Peruvian Air Force acquired 18 Queen Airs in 1965–1966.
Peruvian Army
 
 Philippine Army
 
 South African Air Force 1975-1992
 
 Royal Thai Air Force
 
 United States Army
 
 Uruguayan Air Force
 
 Venezuelan Air Force - Two Model 65s and seven A80s.
 Venezuelan Army
 Venezuelan National Guard

Specifications (Queen Air B80)

See also

References

Notes

Bibliography
"Andean Air Power...The Peruvian Air Force". Air International, May 1988. Vol. 34, No. 5. pp. 224–235, 240.
 Harding, Stephen. U.S. Army Aircraft Since 1947. Shrewsbury, UK: Airlife Publishing Ltd., 1990. .  
 Hatch, Paul F. "Air Forces of the World: Venezuelan Army Air Arm (Aviación del Ejercito Venezolana)". Air Pictorial, April 1994, Vol. 46 No. 4. p. 127.
 Hatch, Paul F. "World's Air Forces 1986". Flight International, 29 November 1986, Vol. 130, No. 4039. pp. 30–104. .
 Pelletier, A. J. Beech Aircraft and their Predecessors. Annapolis, Maryland, USA: Naval Institute Press, 1995. .
 Rivas, Santiago. "Cracking the Drug cartels". Air International, April 2021. Vol. 100, No. 4, pp. 46–49 
 Taylor, John W. R. Jane's All the World's Aircraft 1965–66. London: Sampson Low, Marston & Co. Ltd., 1965.
 Taylor, John W. R. Jane's All the World's Aircraft 1971–72. London: Sampson Low, Marston & Co. Ltd., 1971. .
 Taylor, John W. R. Jane's All the World's Aircraft 1976-77. London:Jane's Yearbooks, 1976. .

1950s United States civil utility aircraft
Queen Air
Low-wing aircraft
Aircraft first flown in 1958
Twin piston-engined tractor aircraft